Epijana is a genus of moths in the family Eupterotidae.

Species
 Epijana cinerea Holland, 1893
 Epijana cosima Plötz, 1880
 Epijana latifasciata Dall'Asta & Poncin, 1980
 Epijana meridionalis Dall'Asta & Poncin, 1980

References

Janinae
Moth genera